The 1925 Iowa Hawkeyes football team was an American football team that represented the University of Iowa as a member of the Big Ten Conference during the 1925 Big Ten football season. In its second season under head coach Burt Ingwersen, the team compiled a 5–3 record (2–2 against conference opponents) and outscored opponents by a total of 121 to 74. The team played its home games at Iowa Field in Iowa City, Iowa.

Schedule

References

Iowa
Iowa Hawkeyes football seasons
Iowa Hawkeyes football